Martin Kearns (7 March 1977 – 14 September 2015) was an English drummer, specializing in death metal, known for his association with Bolt Thrower since 1994. He joined the band at age 17 after playing in several local bands in Coventry, playing anything from metal to reggae, having been playing pub gigs since the age of 14.

Bolt Thrower

Kearns subsequently left due to personal reasons in 1998, he returned to Bolt Thrower in 2000. Martin was the longest standing drummer for Bolt Thrower. He recorded drums on both the Honour-Valour-Pride album, and on Those Once Loyal, the latter of which has been met with widespread critical acclaim from magazines such as Rock Sound, Rock Hard and Metal Hammer.

Death
Kearns died unexpectedly at the age of 38, on 14 September 2015. The band posted on Sputnikmusic that Kearns reported breathing troubles and lightheadedness during a practice session, and, after trying to relax with a shower and nap, was found to have died peacefully in his sleep from a heart attack.  The following year, the remaining members of Bolt Thrower eventually decided to dissolve the band rather than replace Kearns, with frontman Karl Willetts stating, "I can confirm that Bolt Thrower are definitely over for good. There will be no reunion tours etc... no compromise."

Discography

Studio albums:
Honour – Valour – Pride (Metal Blade Records, 2002)
Those Once Loyal (Metal Blade Records, 2005)

References

External links
 Bolt Thrower page @ Metal Blade
 Official Bolt Thrower website
 Extensive Bolt Thrower FAQ

1977 births
2015 deaths
English heavy metal drummers
Bolt Thrower members